The following is a list of events affecting Canadian television in 2014. Events listed include television show debuts, finales, cancellations, and channel launches, closures and rebrandings.

Events

Notable events

January

March

April

May

July

August

October

Television programs

Programs debuting in 2014
Series currently listed here have been announced by their respective networks as scheduled to premiere in 2014. Note that shows may be delayed or cancelled by the network between now and their scheduled air dates.

Programs ending in 2014

Television stations

Stations changing network affiliation
The following is a list of television stations that have made or will make noteworthy network affiliation changes in 2014.

Network launches

See also
 2014 in Canada
 List of Canadian films of 2014

References